Rogier is a rapid transit station in Brussels, Belgium, consisting of both a metro station (on the northern segment of lines 2 and 6) and a premetro (underground tram) station (serving lines 3 and 4 on the North–South Axis between Brussels-North railway station and Albert premetro station). It is located under the Small Ring (Brussels' inner ring road) at the Place Charles Rogier/Karel Rogierplein in the municipality of the Saint-Josse-ten-Noode, north of the City of Brussels.

The station opened as a premetro station on 18 August 1974 and became a full metro station on 2 October 1988. It was named after the city square above ground, itself named after Charles Rogier, Belgium's 13th Prime Minister.

References

External links

Brussels metro stations
Railway stations opened in 1974
Saint-Josse-ten-Noode